Salbia mizaralis is a moth in the family Crambidae. It was described by Herbert Druce in 1899. It is found in Panama and Florida.

References

Spilomelinae
Moths described in 1899